Kouya Sidia is a village in the Faranah region of Guinea. It has a population of 1200.

Description
The village is led by Mamady Conde who replaced his elder brother Yonay in 2014 as the Sotikemo (Chief). The town has a three-room school which serves this village and Simbun and Duoko. The population is about 1,200 people, who live in buildings made from air-dried bricks. The hospital is constructed from concrete.

History
From 2014 to 2018 the village had three new wells installed and a new school. In 2019, a benefit concert was held at an arts centre in Cumberland, Maine to help fund the addition of a library to his home village.

References 

Populated places in the Faranah Region